Kulturzentrum Schlachthof (literally: Culture Center Slaughterhouse) may refer to:

Kulturzentrum Schlachthof (Wiesbaden)